The Sumathi Best Teledrama Supporting Actress Award is presented annually in Sri Lanka by the Sumathi Group of Campany associated with many commercial brands for the best Sri Lankan Upcoming actress of the year in television screen.

The award was first given in 1995. Following is a list of the winners of this prestigious title since then.

Awards

References

Upcoming Actress
Awards for actresses